Shivajirao Adhalarao Patil (born 8 May 1956) was a Member of Parliament in the Lok Sabha from Shirur and member of the Shiv Sena. Shivajirao Adhalarao Patil won the Shirur Lok Sabha seat by margin of 301,814 votes.
He was also a member of the 14th Lok Sabha and 15th Lok Sabha of India. He represents the Shirur constituency in Pune District of Maharashtra. He had also published his autobiography in Marathi titled "Anahat". He has been awarded with Sansad Ratna Award, Top performers of Indian Parliament in 2014 and 2016.

Positions held
 2004: Elected to 14th Lok Sabha(1st term)
 2006: Member, Standing Committee on Defence
 2009: Re-elected to 15th Lok Sabha(2nd term)
 2009: Member, Standing Committee on Information Technology
 2014: Re-elected to 16th Lok Sabha(3rd term)
 2014:	Member, Committee on Science & Technology, Environment & Forests

Dynalog (India) Limited
Mr. Patil founded Dynalog in 1978. Under his guidance Dynalog has emerged from a small firm and grown to a firm that is recognized and reputed both nationally as well as internationally.
Dynalogindia in the business of providing “Intelligent Automation Solutions”. Solutions that are designed with your business needs in mind and delivered on a “turn-key” basis

Social Services
Mr. Patil involves himself in social services like the setting up of the New English School at Landewadi. He is also set up a co-operative pathasanstha which lends money to the needy and also provides employment to the youth of the area. The Bhairavnath Co-operative Credit Society was also founded by Mr. Patil.

See also
 Lok Sabha

References

External links
 official website
 Shiv Sena Home Page
 Official biographical sketch in Parliament of India website
 loksabha mp biodata

 

Living people
1955 births
People from Maharashtra
India MPs 2009–2014
India MPs 2004–2009
Marathi politicians
People from Pune district
Lok Sabha members from Maharashtra
India MPs 2014–2019
Politics of Pune district
Shiv Sena politicians